The George R. Kress House is a Tudor Revival-style home in a canyons area of Los Angeles, California that was built in 1931.  It was listed on the National Register of Historic Places in 1998.

It faces east. It has a terra cotta tile roof.

It is significant both for its association with a builder and practical engineer who moved buildings, George R. Kress, and for its architecture.

Kress moved hundreds of houses in Pittsburgh and in Los Angeles.  In Los Angeles the buildings he moved included mansions and some 13-story buildings.

References

External links
National Register of Historic Places Registration File

Houses on the National Register of Historic Places in Los Angeles
Tudor Revival architecture in California